Bart Martens (born 1969) is a Belgian politician and a member of the SP.A. He was elected as a member of the Belgian Senate in 2007.

Notes

Living people
Socialistische Partij Anders politicians
Members of the Belgian Federal Parliament
1969 births
21st-century Belgian politicians